Mio is a feminine Japanese given name, as well as a unisex Swedish given name. Notable people with the name include:

 MIQ (vocalist) (born 1955), female Japanese pop and anime theme song vocal artist, who first used MIO as her name

, Japanese model and actress
, Japanese singer
, Japanese actress
, Japanese female announcer
, Japanese professional wrestler
, Japanese competitive swimmer
, Japanese football player
, Japanese gravure idol
, Japanese actress, model and tarento 
, Japanese professional basketball
, Japanese professional wrestler
, Japanese politician
, Japanese actress and singer
, Japanese idol, a member of HKT48
, Japanese kickboxer
, Japanese female rugby union player
 Mio Yoshizumi, former member of the Japanese girl group Kamen Rider Girls
, Japanese actress, model and tarento

Fictional characters
 Mio, a character in the book Mio, My Son, by Astrid Lindgren
 Mio, a character in the tokusatsu series Ressha Sentai ToQger
 Mio, a character in the video game Grandia
 Mio, a character in the video game Xenoblade Chronicles 3
 Mio Akiyama, a character in the manga series K-On!
 Mio Amakura, a character in the video game series Fatal Frame
 Mio Chibana, a main character in the manga series L'étranger
 Mio Minato, a character in the anime series Aikatsu Friends!
 Mio Naganohara, a main character from the anime and manga series Nichijou
 Mio Naruse, a character in the light novel series The Testament of Sister New Devil
 Mio Sakamoto, a character in the media franchise Strike Witches
 Mio Suzuki, a character in the tokusatsu series Kamen Rider Kiva, also known as the Pearlshell Fangire/Queen
 Mio Takamiya, a character in the light novel series Date A Live
 Mio Ookami, a Japanese member of Hololive

Japanese feminine given names